The Morals of Marcus Ordeyne is a 1905 British novel written by William John Locke. Along with his next book, The Beloved Vagabond, it was a major success.

Plot summary
A middle aged schoolmaster unexpectedly inherits money and a title. Walking through a park he finds a young girl weeping - she's a harem girl who has been abandoned by her would-be lover after escaping from Syria. Not knowing what else to do, Sir Marcus brings her to his home.

Adaptations
In 1907, the novel was adapted by Locke into a play. In 1915, the first silent version was made with Marie Doro who starred in the 1907 play. In 1921, a silent film adaptation was made. In 1935, Miles Mander directed The Morals of Marcus, with Ian Hunter in the title role.

References

Bibliography
 Elwin, Malcolm. Old Gods Falling. Collins, 1939.
 Munden, Kenneth White. American Film Institute Catalog: Feature Films 1921-1930. University of California Press, 1971.
 

1905 British novels
British adventure novels
Novels by William John Locke
British novels adapted into films